Atolls Rural LLG is a local-level government (LLG) of the Autonomous Region of Bougainville, Papua New Guinea.

Wards
01. Carterets
02. Tasman
03. Mortlock
04. Nuguria

References

Local-level governments of the Autonomous Region of Bougainville